Damir in Iran may refer to:
 Damir, Kerman (دمير - Damīr)
 Damir, Mazandaran (دامير - Dāmīr)